A Love Letter to You 2 is the second commercial mixtape by American rapper Trippie Redd. It was released on October 6, 2017, by TenThousand Projects and Caroline Distribution. It is the second release into Trippie Redd's A Love Letter to You series, of which began in May 2017. The album reached number 34 on the US Billboard 200.

Background
The mixtape follow suit within five months after the release of the first installment in the A Love Letter to You series. The tracks "In Too Deep", "Woah Woah Woah" and "I Know How to Self Destruct" were made available prior to the release of the full mixtape. On September 11, 2017, Trippie Redd revealed the release date and cover art, which is a collage of photos from his childhood.

Critical reception

Alphonse Pierre of HotNewHipHop stated that while he felt Trippie Redd is a "future star", A Love Letter to You 2 was not the "right project to get him there". Pierre wrote that "A couple of good, scratch that, great collaborations with ParisTheProducer, Goose the Guru and Digital Nas aren't enough to completely overshadow Trippie's bad decision-making and indecisiveness on A Love Letter To You 2", saying that once it seems like Trippie has found his "groove" on the mixtape, he follows it with songs like "Hellboy" that include "cliche rhyming patterns" and "mood-killing production". Sheldon Pearce of Pitchfork called the mixtape "all hooks, all emotion, but features poorly designed songs that lack the spark of his previous mixtape", elaborating that "Few songs on A Love Letter to You 2 have more than one Trippie verse. There are songs where he only sings the chorus. Those hooks are usually just echoes, the same word, phrase, or basic idea repeated or reiterated. [...] Still, nearly every Trippie song can be enjoyable on the condition you don't pay too close attention."

Track listing

Charts

References

2017 mixtape albums
Trippie Redd albums
Sequel albums